Stefan Jaimy Struve (born February 18, 1988) is a Dutch former mixed martial artist who competed as a heavyweight in the Ultimate Fighting Championship (UFC). At , he is the tallest fighter in the history of the UFC.

Background
Growing up in the Netherlands, Struve played football until the age of 14. When Struve's brother took him to the local martial arts gym (owned by Bob Schreiber), he decided to pursue a career in mixed martial arts (MMA) instead. Struve had his first and only amateur MMA bout at age 16 and won via head kick knockout.

Mixed martial arts career
Struve made his professional debut for the GFN organization when he was 17, fighting John De Wilde at Gentlemen Fight Night. By late 2008, he had racked up a record of 16–2, losing once (in his second fight) via injury to Romualds Garkulis and again in the second round of a Star Of Peresvit tournament in Ukraine, to future Bellator Light heavyweight Champion Christian M'Pumbu.

In 2008, Struve negotiated with the DREAM and Affliction promotions, before signing a four-fight deal with the UFC.

Ultimate Fighting Championship
Struve lost his UFC debut bout at UFC 95 to Junior dos Santos in the first round, after dos Santos stormed Struve with an aggressive flurry of punches.

Struve won his next fight on June 13, 2009, at UFC 99, over Denis Stojnić. Struve was cut open by hammer fists from Stojnic while on his back in the first round and, despite bleeding profusely, persevered in the second round and gained Stojnic's back, eventually locking in a rear naked choke to win by submission at 2:37 of the second round.

Struve defeated previously undefeated UFC newcomer Chase Gormley on October 24, 2009, at UFC 104 (also winning the "Submission of the Night" award). The bout was composed mainly of grappling after Gormley took Struve down. There, Struve attempted submissions, before giving up top position to Gormley and securing a triangle choke.

Struve then signed a new four-fight deal with the UFC. His first fight of this contract was against returning veteran Paul Buentello, at UFC 107. Struve replaced injured Todd Duffee. Struve defeated Buentello by majority decision (29–28, 29–28, and 28–28). After the fight, Struve stated "I don't feel like a winner right now", apparently displeased with his performance.

Struve fought The Ultimate Fighter: Heavyweights winner Roy Nelson on March 31, 2010, at UFC Fight Night 21. Nelson ducked under several of Struve's punches and scored a solid right hook on his chin for the knockout.

Struve then faced undefeated UFC newcomer Christian Morecraft at UFC 117. Struve defeated Morecraft via TKO due to punches at 0:22 of round 2. Morecraft dominated Struve in round one with a ground and pound attack but was counterpunched and knocked out by Struve during an aggressive rush in round two. The performance won Struve the  "Knockout of the Night" bonus award. Between rounds, Struve told his corner, "I'm almost fainting right now, guys."

In September 2010, Struve signed a new four-fight contract with the UFC.

Struve defeated the previously undefeated Sean McCorkle via first-round TKO on December 11, 2010, at UFC 124. After being taken down early and escaping a kimura attempt, Struve swept McCorkle, gaining mount, and rained down a steady stream of strikes for the victory.

Struve faced the then-undefeated Travis Browne on May 28, 2011, at UFC 130. Despite starting off strong, nearly locking in a D'arce choke, Struve would mistakenly jump for a flying knee, which Browne countered with a superman punch to KO Struve.

Struve defeated Pat Barry on October 1, 2011, at UFC on Versus 6. After a long feeling-out process in the 1st round, Struve clinched with Barry, dragged him to the ground, and swiftly locked in a triangle armbar, earning the "Submission of the Night" bonus award in the process.

Struve faced Dave Herman on February 15, 2012, at UFC on Fuel TV 1, winning via second-round TKO. During a tepid first round, Struve seemed slow to start, finding little success against Herman who closed the distance and looked the more agile striker of the two. In the second round, Struve began to open up, mixing in a body-clinch take-down while piecing together striking combinations. He landed a left hook, inside leg kick, left hook & right uppercut in quick succession to drop a stunned Herman, proceeding to mount his opponent and deliver strikes until forcing the referee's intervention.

Struve was expected to face Mark Hunt on May 26, 2012, at UFC 146 but, on May 17, 2012, Hunt withdrew from the bout due to an injury and was replaced by Lavar Johnson. Struve quickly submitted Johnson in the first round with an armbar, earning his third "Submission of the Night" bonus.

Struve faced undefeated prospect, Stipe Miocic at UFC on Fuel TV 5 on September 29, 2012. The opening stanza saw Miocic slightly edge Struve in a competitive stand-up battle, until the second round when Struve utilized his reach more effectively and became more aggressive. He won the fight via TKO in the second round. The performance earned both participants "Fight of the Night" honors.

Struve faced Mark Hunt on March 3, 2013, at UFC on Fuel TV 8. Hunt defeated Struve via third-round TKO, and broke Struve's jaw with one of his final punches of the fight.

On August 20, 2013, Struve was reported to have suffered from a leaking aortic valve as well as an enlarged heart, doctors found that Stefan has a bicuspid aortic valve, which means that his aortic valve only has two leaflets, instead of three. It was decided to treat his condition with medication for the next two months. On October 8, 2013, reports came that Struve's heart condition was improving and that a return to fighting was still a possibility. November 24, 2013, it was reported that he was ready to return to a full training schedule.

On April 7, 2014, manager Lex McMahon announced in the show "The MMA Hour" that Struve has approval from the doctor to fight again and return to the Octagon.
Quote: “I think we’re very close. Very exciting news with Stefan, he was actually cleared by his doctor in the Netherlands. Right now we’re just waiting for a copy of his file to be translated so that the UFC can have their doctor take a look at it, and they’re going to determine whether or not to have Stefan get a second opinion or not. If they do bring him out for a second opinion, that would likely be out in Los Angeles with the UFC’s cardiologist that they use frequently. I believe they sent Dan Hardy to him and a few other folks.”

Struve was expected to face Matt Mitrione on July 5, 2014, at UFC 175. During the first fight of the main card, however, Struve fainted in the dressing room and had an elevated heart rate. UFC personnel decided to cancel the fight. Struve was later taken to the hospital for precautionary reasons.

Struve faced Alistair Overeem at UFC on Fox 13 on December 13, 2014. He lost the fight via KO in the first round.

Struve faced Antônio Rodrigo Nogueira at UFC 190 on August 1, 2015. He won the fight by unanimous decision, marking only his second fight in his career to end in decision.

Struve faced Jared Rosholt on November 14, 2015, at UFC 193.  He lost the fight by unanimous decision.

Struve faced Antônio Silva on May 8, 2016, at UFC Fight Night 87. He won the bout via knockout in the first round after catching his opponent with a right hook on the chin followed with a knee to the body and multiple elbows to the side of his opponent's head. This win also earned Struve his first Performance of the Night bonus.

Struve was expected to face Ruslan Magomedov on October 8, 2016, at UFC 204. However, Magomedov pulled out in early September citing a staph infection. He was replaced by Daniel Omielańczuk. Struve won the back and forth fight via submission in the second round.

Struve was originally expected to face Junior dos Santos in a rematch on February 19, 2017, at UFC Fight Night 105. However, on January 12, Struve pulled out due to a shoulder injury.

Struve faced Alexander Volkov on 2 September 2017 at UFC Fight Night: Volkov vs. Struve. He lost the fight via TKO in the third round. Despite the loss, Struve earned his second Fight of the Night bonus award for the bout.

Struve faced Andrei Arlovski at UFC 222. He lost the fight by unanimous decision.

Struve faced Marcin Tybura on July 22, 2018, at UFC Fight Night 134.  He lost the fight via unanimous decision.

As the ultimate fight of his prevailing contract, Struve faced Marcos Rogério de Lima on February 23, 2019, at UFC on ESPN+ 3 in the last fight of his contract with the UFC. He won the fight by arm-triangle choke in the second round despite having been knocked down by the first punch of the fight. After the fight, Struve indicated this could be his final fight. This win earned him the Performance of the Night award.

After a brief hiatus to contemplate his fighting future, Struve signed a new six-fight contract with the UFC and faced Ben Rothwell on December 7, 2019, at UFC on ESPN 7. He lost the fight via technical knockout in round two. The finish was controversial as Rothwell had accidentally hit Struve in the groin twice and was docked one point for these infractions in the second round. The referee encouraged the compromised Struve to continue, resulting in a finish for Rothwell late in the second round.

Struve faced Tai Tuivasa on October 24, 2020 at UFC 254. He lost the fight via knockout in the first round.

On February 15, 2021, Struve announced his retirement from professional mixed martial arts competition.

Personal life
In October 2013, Struve's father Jaap died of cancer. Struve has an enlarged heart and a bicuspid aortic valve.

Stefan and his wife have a son, Tobi (born 2020).

Championships and accomplishments

Mixed martial arts
Ultimate Fighting Championship
Fight of the Night (Two times)
Performance of the Night (Two times)
Knockout of the Night (One time) 
Submission of the Night (Three times) 
Cage Gladiators
Cage Gladiators Heavyweight Champion (One time)

Mixed martial arts record

|-
|Loss
|align=center|29–13
|Tai Tuivasa
|KO (punches)
|UFC 254 
|
|align=center|1
|align=center|4:59
|Abu Dhabi, United Arab Emirates
|  
|-
|Loss
|align=center|29–12
|Ben Rothwell
|TKO (punches)
|UFC on ESPN: Overeem vs. Rozenstruik 
|
|align=center|2
|align=center|4:57
|Washington, D.C., United States
|   
|-
|Win
|align=center|29–11
|Marcos Rogério de Lima
|Submission (arm-triangle choke)
|UFC Fight Night: Błachowicz vs. Santos 
|
|align=center|2
|align=center|2:21
|Prague, Czech Republic
|| 

|-
|Loss
|align=center|28–11
|Marcin Tybura
|Decision (unanimous)
|UFC Fight Night: Shogun vs. Smith 
|
|align=center|3
|align=center|5:00
|Hamburg, Germany
|
|- 
|Loss
|align=center|28–10
|Andrei Arlovski
|Decision (unanimous)
|UFC 222 
|
|align=center|3
|align=center|5:00
|Las Vegas, Nevada, United States
|
|-
|Loss
|align=center|28–9
|Alexander Volkov
|TKO (punches)
|UFC Fight Night: Volkov vs. Struve 
|
|align=center|3
|align=center|3:30
|Rotterdam, Netherlands
| 
|-
|Win
|align=center|28–8
|Daniel Omielańczuk
|Submission (D'Arce choke)
|UFC 204
|
|align=center|2
|align=center|1:41
|Manchester, England
|
|-
|Win
|align=center|27–8
|Antônio Silva
|KO (elbows) 
|UFC Fight Night: Overeem vs. Arlovski
|
|align=center|1
|align=center|0:16
|Rotterdam, Netherlands
| 
|-
|Loss
|align=center|26–8
|Jared Rosholt
|Decision (unanimous)
|UFC 193
|
|align=center|3
|align=center|5:00
|Melbourne, Australia
|
|-
|Win
|align=center|26–7
|Antônio Rodrigo Nogueira
|Decision (unanimous)
|UFC 190
|
|align=center|3
|align=center|5:00
|Rio de Janeiro, Brazil
|
|-
| Loss
| align=center| 25–7
| Alistair Overeem
| KO (punches)
| UFC on Fox: dos Santos vs. Miocic
| 
| align=center| 1
| align=center| 4:13
| Phoenix, Arizona, United States
| 
|-
| Loss
| align=center| 25–6
| Mark Hunt
| TKO (punches)
| UFC on Fuel TV: Silva vs. Stann
| 
| align=center| 3
| align=center| 1:44
| Saitama, Japan
| 
|-
| Win
| align=center| 25–5
| Stipe Miocic
| TKO (punches)
| UFC on Fuel TV: Struve vs. Miocic
| 
| align=center| 2
| align=center| 3:50
| Nottingham, England
| 
|-
| Win
| align=center| 24–5
| Lavar Johnson
| Submission (armbar)
| UFC 146
| 
| align=center| 1
| align=center| 1:05
| Las Vegas, Nevada, United States
| 
|-
| Win
| align=center| 23–5
| Dave Herman
| TKO (punches)
| UFC on Fuel TV: Sanchez vs. Ellenberger
| 
| align=center| 2
| align=center| 3:52
| Omaha, Nebraska, United States
| 
|-
| Win
| align=center| 22–5
| Pat Barry
| Submission (triangle armbar)
| UFC Live: Cruz vs. Johnson
| 
| align=center| 2
| align=center| 3:22
| Washington, D.C., United States
| 
|-
| Loss
| align=center| 21–5
| Travis Browne
| KO (punch)
| UFC 130
| 
| align=center| 1
| align=center| 4:11 
| Las Vegas, Nevada, United States
| 
|-
| Win
| align=center| 21–4
| Sean McCorkle
| TKO (punches)
| UFC 124
| 
| align=center| 1
| align=center| 3:55
| Montreal, Quebec, Canada
| 
|-
| Win
| align=center| 20–4
| Christian Morecraft
| TKO (punches)
| UFC 117
| 
| align=center| 2
| align=center| 0:22
| Oakland, California, United States
| 
|-
| Loss
| align=center| 19–4
| Roy Nelson
| KO (punches)
| UFC Fight Night: Florian vs. Gomi
| 
| align=center| 1
| align=center| 0:39
| Charlotte, North Carolina, United States
| 
|-
| Win
| align=center| 19–3
| Paul Buentello
| Decision (majority)
| UFC 107
| 
| align=center| 3
| align=center| 5:00
| Memphis, Tennessee, United States
| 
|-
| Win
| align=center| 18–3
| Chase Gormley
| Submission (triangle choke)
| UFC 104
| 
| align=center| 1
| align=center| 4:04
| Los Angeles, California, United States
| 
|-
| Win
| align=center| 17–3
| Denis Stojnić
| Submission (rear-naked choke)
| UFC 99
| 
| align=center| 2
| align=center| 2:37
| Cologne, Germany
| 
|-
| Loss
| align=center| 16–3
| Junior dos Santos
| TKO (punches)
| UFC 95
| 
| align=center| 1
| align=center| 0:54
| London, England
| 
|-
| Win
| align=center| 16–2
| Mario Neto
| Submission (rear-naked choke)
| Cage Gladiators 10: Clash of the Titans
| 
| align=center| 2
| align=center| 3:19
| Liverpool, England
| 
|-
| Win
| align=center| 15–2
| Ralf Wonnink
| Submission (armbar)
| K.O. Events: Tough Is Not Enough
| 
| align=center| 1
| align=center| 0:15
| Rotterdam, Netherlands
| 
|-
| Win
| align=center| 14–2
| Yuji Sakuragi
| Submission (triangle choke)
| M-1 Challenge 6: Korea
| 
| align=center| 1
| align=center| 2:30
| Seoul, South Korea
| 
|-
| Win
| align=center| 13–2
| Colin Robinson
| Submission (triangle choke)
| Cage Gladiators 8
| 
| align=center| 1
| align=center| N/A
| Liverpool, England
| 
|-
| Win
| align=center| 12–2
| Ralf Wonnink
| Submission (rear-naked choke)
| Beast of the East
| 
| align=center| 1
| align=center| N/A
| Zutphen, Netherlands
| 
|-
| Loss
| align=center| 11–2
| Christian M'Pumbu
| Submission (D'Arce choke)
| Star of Peresvit
| 
| align=center| 1
| align=center| 2:05
| Kyiv, Ukraine
| 
|-
| Win
| align=center| 11–1
| Sergey Danish
| TKO (corner stoppage)
| Star of Peresvit
| 
| align=center| 2
| align=center| 2:20
| Kyiv, Ukraine
| 
|-
| Win
| align=center| 10–1
| Tomek Smykowski
| Submission (choke)
| Tempel Fight School: Mixfight Gala VI
| 
| align=center| 1
| align=center| N/A
| Munich, Germany
| 
|-
| Win
| align=center| 9–1
| Tom Blackledge
| Submission (triangle choke)
| Cage Gladiators 5
| 
| align=center| 1
| align=center| 2:14
| Liverpool, England
| 
|-
| Win
| align=center| 8–1
| Denis Komkin
| Submission (rear-naked choke)
| Bratsk Combat Sports Festival: Siberian Challenge 1
| 
| align=center| 1
| align=center| N/A
| Bratsk, Russia
| 
|-
| Win
| align=center| 7–1
| Marko Šintic
| Submission (triangle choke)
| Combined Forces: The Real Deal
| 
| align=center| 1
| align=center| N/A
| Emmen, Netherlands
| 
|-
| Win
| align=center| 6–1
| Atte Backman
| Submission (triangle choke)
| Fight Festival 21
| 
| align=center| 1
| align=center| 3:54
| Helsinki, Finland
| 
|-
| Win
| align=center| 5–1
| Florian Müller
| TKO (punches)
| Outsider Cup 6
| 
| align=center| 2
| align=center| 1:38
| Duisburg, Germany
| 
|-
| Win
| align=center| 4–1
| Marcus Sursa
| Submission (triangle choke)
| World Extreme Fighting: Orleans Arena
| 
| align=center| 1
| align=center| 3:01
| Las Vegas, Nevada, United States
| 
|-
| Win
| align=center| 3–1
| Murat Bourekba
| DQ (fish-hooking)
| Staredown City
| 
| align=center| N/A
| align=center| N/A
| Oostzaan, Netherlands
| 
|-
| Win
| align=center| 2–1
| Emir Smajlovic
| KO (punches)
| MMA: Event
| 
| align=center| 1
| align=center| N/A
| Netherlands
| 
|-
| Loss
| align=center| 1–1
| Romualds Garkulis
| TKO (corner stoppage)
| Mixfight Gala
| 
| align=center| 1
| align=center| 5:00
| Netherlands
| 
|-
| Win
| align=center| 1–0
| John de Wilde
| Submission (armbar)
| Gentlemen Fight Night
| 
| align=center| 1
| align=center| N/A
| Netherlands
|

See also
 List of male mixed martial artists

Notes and references

External links

1988 births
Living people
Dutch male kickboxers
Dutch male mixed martial artists
Heavyweight mixed martial artists
Mixed martial artists utilizing kickboxing
Mixed martial artists utilizing Brazilian jiu-jitsu
Dutch practitioners of Brazilian jiu-jitsu
Sportspeople from Beverwijk
Ultimate Fighting Championship male fighters